Daddy Dearest is an American television sitcom that aired on Fox, on Sunday nights from September 5 to December 5, 1993.

Synopsis
The series revolved around Dr. Steven Mitchell, a psychologist who lived in Manhattan with his young son and, despite his constant insults and put downs, his father Al (Don Rickles), an obnoxious used car salesman who was recently separated from his wife Helen (Renée Taylor).

Cast
 Richard Lewis as Dr. Steven Mitchell
 Don Rickles as Al Mitchell
 Renée Taylor as Helen Mitchell
 Sydney Walsh as Christine Winters
 Alice Carter as Lisa
 Carey Eidel as Larry Mitchell
 Jeffrey Bomberger as Danny Mitchell
 Jonathan Gibby as Danny Mitchell (pilot)
 Barney Martin as Pete Peter

Episodes

References

External links

1993 American television series debuts
1993 American television series endings
1990s American sitcoms
Fox Broadcasting Company original programming
Television series about Jews and Judaism
English-language television shows
Television shows set in New York City
Television series by HBO Independent Productions
Television series by 3 Arts Entertainment